Stéphanie Provost (born 27 May 1973) is a French female rugby union player. 
She represented  at the 2002 Women's Rugby World Cup, 2006 Women's Rugby World Cup, and 2010 Women's Rugby World Cup. She is the third most capped French female rugby player. 
She is a Physical Education teacher.

References

1973 births
Living people
French female rugby union players